Now That's What I Call the 90s is a special edition of the Now! series released in the United Kingdom on 26 October 2009. The three-CD set has 60 UK number one hits from the 1990s. This was the first album in the series to combine songs from every year of the 1990s.

Track listing

CD one
Take That : "Back for Good"
Wet Wet Wet : "Love Is All Around"
Elton John : "Sacrifice"
Robbie Williams : "She's the One"
Oasis : "Don't Look Back in Anger"
Deep Blue Something : "Breakfast at Tiffany's"
Gabrielle : "Dreams"
All Saints : "Never Ever"
Shakespears Sister : "Stay"
Sinéad O'Connor : "Nothing Compares 2 U"
The Beautiful South : "A Little Time"
The Righteous Brothers : "Unchained Melody"
Ronan Keating : "When You Say Nothing at All"
Westlife : "Flying Without Wings"
Boyzone : "No Matter What"
Jason Donovan : "Any Dream Will Do"
Backstreet Boys : "I Want It That Way"
Geri Halliwell : "Mi Chico Latino"
Spice Girls : "Spice Up Your Life"
Cher : "The Shoop Shoop Song (It's in His Kiss)"

CD two
Spice Girls : "Wannabe"
Hanson : "MMMBop"
S Club 7 : "Bring It All Back"
Steps : "Tragedy"
Aqua : "Barbie Girl"
Eiffel 65 : "Blue (Da Ba Dee)"
Five : "Keep On Movin'"
Britney Spears : "...Baby One More Time"
Christina Aguilera : "Genie in a Bottle"
R. Kelly : "I Believe I Can Fly"
White Town : "Your Woman"
Blur : "Country House"
Babylon Zoo : "Spaceman"
Eternal featuring Bebe Winans : "I Wanna Be the Only One"
George Michael : "Fastlove"
Livin' Joy : "Dreamer"
Wamdue Project : "King of My Castle"
Baby D : "Let Me Be Your Fantasy"
Fatboy Slim : "Praise You"
Meat Loaf : "I'd Do Anything for Love (But I Won't Do That)"

CD three
Adamski : "Killer"
Beats International : "Dub Be Good to Me"
UB40 : "(I Can't Help) Falling in Love with You"
Shaggy : "Boombastic"
Right Said Fred : "Deeply Dippy"
Erasure : "Take a Chance on Me"
Pato Banton with Robin Campbell and Ali Campbell: "Baby Come Back"
Chaka Demus & Pliers : "Twist & Shout"
Simply Red : "Fairground"
Stiltskin : "Inside"
Vic Reeves & The Wonder Stuff : "Dizzy"
Chesney Hawkes : "The One and Only"
Vanilla Ice : "Ice Ice Baby"
The Steve Miller Band : "The Joker"
Charles & Eddie : "Would I Lie to You?"
Tasmin Archer : "Sleeping Satellite"
Enigma : "Sadeness (Part I)"
Maria McKee : "Show Me Heaven"
Boyzone : "Words"
East 17 : "Stay Another Day"

References

External links
 Now That's What I Call the 90s front- and backcover
 Now That's What I Call The 90s Track List

2009 compilation albums
1990s
EMI Records compilation albums
Virgin Records compilation albums
Universal Music Group compilation albums